Arnaud Montebourg (born 30 October 1962) is a French politician, lawyer and entrepreneur who served as the Minister of Industrial Renewal from 2012 to 2014, then as Minister of Economy, Industrial Renewal, and Digital Affairs, 31 March 2014 until his resignation on 25 August.

He is a former member of the Socialist Party (PS), which he left in 2018.

He previously served as the member of the National Assembly for the 6th constituency of Saône-et-Loire from 1997 until 2012, and President of the General Council of Saône-et-Loire from 2008 to 2012. 

In 2021, he announced his candidacy for the French presidential election of 2022, before stepping down three months before the election.

Early life and education
Montebourg was born on 30 October, 1962, in the French commune of Clamecy, in Nièvre region. His father, Michel Montebourg, who was a tax inspector for the Ministry of Economy and Finances, was born in 1933. His mother, Leïla Ould Cadi, who was born in 1939 in Algeria, was of Algerian and French descent; she was born into a family of wālis (governors) from Hachem in Northern Algeria. His Algerian grandfather fought in the French Army during World War II. His Algerian great-grandfather, Ahmed Ould Cadi, who was an agha (chieftain), fought against the Ottoman caliphate before joining the French Army. He was appointed Grand Cross of the Legion of Honour in 1867.

He began working as an attorney with notable attorney Thierry Levy.

He has worked in several publicized cases. In 1995, he worked as the lawyer of Christian Didier, assassin of René Bousquet. Bousquet was a former Vichy official who had been indicted for war crimes and was soon to be tried. Didier was convicted in 1995 and received a 10-year sentence. Didier did not want to be considered insane, so Montebourg helped get the court to recognize him as responsible for the act.

First involvements in politics
Montebourg was first elected to the National Assembly during the 1997 legislative election. He was reelected in 2002 and in 2007.

In 2001, Together with Bastien François, a professor of Political Science at Pantheon-Sorbonne University, Montebourg became the cofounder of the Convention pour la VI-ème République (C6R). This convention called for significant constitutional changes, and for a Sixth French Republic. Its objectives were to decrease the power of the president and allow a parliamentary balance.

Montebourg was one of the founding members of the political movement known as the Nouveau Parti Socialiste (New Socialist Party), where he defended economical protectionism and sovereignty. When the movement ended due to internal difficulties, he created a new movement within the Socialist Party called Rénover, Maintenant (Renewal, Now). He was one of the leading opponents of President Jacques Chirac's immunity from prosecution, especially concerning the corruption scandals in the Paris region.

Montebourg, also supported reporter Denis Robert for his role in revealing the illegal system of double-accounts maintained by Clearstream, a clearing-house based in Luxembourg, involving high-ranking politicians. He has also been engaged in a campaign against the rules governing taxation of foreign nationals and the banking secrecy of Switzerland.

Montebourg was appointed as spokesman for Ségolène Royal's presidential campaign following his endorsement of her candidacy during the Socialist Party primary election in November 2006. On 18 January 2007, Royal suspended him from her campaign for one month the day after he gave an interview on a Canal+ talk show, where he said, "Ségolène Royal has only one fault, her partner." He was referring to the contradictory statements on tax policy made by Royal's partner, François Hollande, who was at the time serving as First Secretary of the Socialist Party. Montebourg had offered his resignation, which Royal refused to accept.

In 2008, Monteboug became President of the General Council of Saône-et-Loire, while at the same time retaining his mandate as a parliamentarian. In 2011, when Dominique Strauss-Kahn was released from prison and flown back to France, Montebourg urged him to apologise for embarrassing the Socialist Party.

Minister during the presidency of François Hollande
Montebourg finished third in the Socialist Party's primary election for the 2012 presidential election, receiving about 17% of the vote. François Hollande finished first and Martine Aubry finished second. After Hollande was elected President of France, Montebourg was appointed as Minister of Industrial Renewal on 16 May 2012 in the government of Prime Minister Jean-Marc Ayrault .

Montebourg defended nuclear energy, considering it "an industry of the future" despite the 2011 Fukushima Daiichi nuclear disaster. On national interests in international trade alliances, Montebourg made further controversial statements about Lakshmi Mittal by declaring that "Mittal's lies since 2006 are overwhelming…he has never kept his word", urging him to leave the country: "We no longer want Mittal in France because they don't respect France."

Montebourg considered the General Electric takeover of Alstom a risk to French sovereignty. He notably introduced a decree, the décret Alstom, nicknamed décret Montebourg by the press, extending the French state's right to veto foreign takeovers of assets in the energy, water, transport, telecommunication, public health sectors. Montebourg was quoted as saying the decree protected France's strategic interests and represented the end of laissez-faire economic policy.

On 28 May 2014, Montebourg said that if the United Kingdom "were to vote to leave the EU, France will roll out the red carpet to British investors who will flee their country. They will all come to France because companies need Europe."
Nevertheless, he supports a balance between the EU's interests and states' interests.

Businesses
In October 2014, Montebourg enrolled in the INSEAD graduate business school for a four-week course and sought a bursary for his studies.
Between 16 and 26 February 2015, he was invited as a visiting professor of economics at Princeton University. On 19 March 2015, he was appointed vice president of the supervisory board of the furniture chain Habitat. On 26 March, the French-based consulting and business analyst company, Talan, announced that Montebourg had been given a place on its strategic policy committee.

Candidacy in the 2017 presidential election
On 21 August 2016, he announced his plans to run as a candidate for the Socialist Party's presidential nomination in the 2017 presidential election. He finished third with 17.8% of the vote.

Candidacy in the 2022 presidential election

On 4 September 2021, after having taken a step back from politics in 2017, Montebourg announced his candidacy in the 2022 presidential election from his home town of Clamecy, without going through a party primary election.

His supporters included the Citizen and Republican Movement, founded by Jean-Pierre Chevènement, the former Socialist minister Laurence Rossignol, Socialist senators Mickaël Vallet and Jean-Claude Tissot, demographer Emmanuel Todd, economist Gaël Giraud, politologist Thomas Guénolé and economist and entrepreneur Valentin Przyluski. He withdrew from the race on 20 January 2022, after failing to gain momentum. He did not endorse other candidates.

Personal life
Montebourg lived from 2010 to 2012 with journalist Audrey Pulvar and from 2014 until 2017 with fellow minister Aurélie Filippetti, with whom he has a daughter, Jeanne, born in September 2015.

In February 2015, Montebourg was called a hero for saving several fellow diners in the New York City brasserie Balthazar from serious injury by single-handedly holding up a large mirror which had fallen from the restaurant's ceiling.

References

External links

  
 Webpage from the National Assembly site 
 Michael C. Behrent, "Stop the World": Arnaud Montebourg and "Deglobalization"(blog post)

1962 births
French people of Algerian descent
Government ministers of France
Living people
People from Nièvre
Sciences Po alumni
Socialist Party (France) politicians
Deputies of the 12th National Assembly of the French Fifth Republic
Deputies of the 13th National Assembly of the French Fifth Republic